My Lucky Star is a 2003 Hong Kong movie directed by Vincent Kok. It was the final film made by Golden Harvest Company before their merger with Orange Sky.

Cast
 Tony Leung Chiu-wai as Lai liu po
 Miriam Yeung as Yip Ku-hung / Scholar Yip Ku-shing
 Ronald Cheng as Crab Duen / Guard Duen
 Teresa Carpio
 Chapman To as Yip's stepmother boyfriend
 William So - cameo
 Patrick Tang as Customer in cybercafe / Imperial guard
 Mark Lui
 Ken Chang
 Joe Cheng Cho
 Cheung Tat-ming
 Audrey Fang Chi Shuen
 Alex Fong Chung Sun
 Alex Fong Lik Sun
 Josie Ho
 Vincent Kok
 Maggie Lau
 Rain Lee Choi-wah
 Sammy Leung
 Maggie Poon Mei Kei
 Tin Kai-man
 Ken Wong Hup Hei
 Shawn Yue
 Kitty Yuen

Awards and nominations
Nominated – Ronald Cheng for Hong Kong Film Award for Best Supporting Actor at the 23rd Hong Kong Film Awards

External links
 IMdB entry
 Hong Kong Cinemagic entry

Hong Kong romantic comedy films
2002 films
Films set in Hong Kong
Films shot in Hong Kong
Films directed by Vincent Kok
2000s Hong Kong films
Hong Kong fantasy comedy films